Josiah Warren (1798–1874) was an American utopian socialist, American individualist anarchist, individualist philosopher, polymath, social reformer, inventor, musician, printer and author. He is regarded by anarchist historians like James J. Martin and Peter Marshall among others as the first American anarchist (although Warren never used the term anarchism himself) and the four-page weekly paper he edited during 1833, The Peaceful Revolutionist, the first anarchist periodical published, was an enterprise for which he built his own printing press, cast his own type, and made his own printing plates.

Life 

Warren was born June 26, 1798. He moved from Boston to Cincinnati, Ohio, where he worked as a music teacher and orchestra leader. They had two children, Caroline (1820–1850) and George (1826–1902), and George wrote a remembrance of his father that can be found in the Labadie Library at the University of Michigan. He invented a tallow-burning lamp in 1821 and manufactured his invention for a number of years in Cincinnati.

In 1825, Warren became aware of the "social system" of Robert Owen and began to talk with others in Cincinnati about founding a communist colony. A Cincinnati colony was attempted without Warren's involvement, but failed.

Cincinnati and Utopia 

He put his theories to the test by establishing an experimental "labor for labor store" called the Cincinnati Time Store in downtown Cincinnati, which facilitated trade by notes backed by a promise to perform labor. This was the first store to use a labor-for-labor note.

Between 1827 and 1830, the store proved successful. Warren closed the store to pursue establishing colonies based on economic mutualism, including "Utopia" and "Modern Times."

Modern Times 

Modern Times, which was located in what is now Brentwood, New York, lasted from approximately 1851 to 1864. It was Josiah Warren's last attempt to put his ideas of Equitable Commerce and sovereignty of the individual, which he had developed over a lifetime of study and experimentation, into action. In 1850, Warren came back to Boston from the Midwest and began searching for an area near a major city, with low land prices, to establish a utopian community.  The inexpensive land enabled Warren to be able to implement his plan to provide homes for families that had never owned one before. The Pine Barrens of long Island where Modern Times was located had an undeserved reputation as having poor soil so he was able to purchase 400 acres at $2.75 an acre with a very small down payment.  Modern Times was a town with neither government nor money nor laws and can accurately be described as anarchistic, yet there was no crime and very little commotion.  The citizens of Modern Times although eschewing the profit motive, were not socialistic in their attitude toward ownership of property or the means of production.  According to author Roger Wunderlich, "On 7 September 1864 the name of the village was changed to Brentwood."

Later life and death 
Warren later returned to the Boston area. From 1864 to 1869, he resided in Cliftondale, Massachusetts, where he twice attempted to establish a mutual town. He then moved back to Boston, where he remained until his death.

Warren died on April 14, 1874, in Charlestown at the home of a friend after developing edema.

Philosophy 

Like Pierre-Joseph Proudhon, Warren chose the libertarian socialist path of anarchism, individualism, and
mutualism. Warren has been considered the "American Proudhon" due to his belief in his labor theory of value "cost the limit of price" in a free-market socialism system  in addition to his support for mutualism through encouraging Mutualist Banks:
“In a letter to John Sullivan Dwight, Greene, writing in January, 1850, mentioned a petition to the Massachusetts General Court for permission to establish a mutual bank, which was signed by Warren, among others.”

Warren's individualistic philosophy arose out of his rejection of Robert Owen's cooperative movement, of which he was an early participant, witnessing in person the failure of Owen's New Harmony commune. Of it, he wrote: "It seemed that the difference of opinion, tastes, and purposes increased just in proportion to the demand for conformity ... It appeared that it was nature's own inherent law of diversity that had conquered us ... our 'united interests' were directly at war with the individualities of persons and circumstances and the instinct of self-preservation". According to Warren, there should be absolutely no community of property; all property should be individualized, and "those who advocated any type of communism with connected property, interests, and responsibilities were doomed to failure because of the individuality of the persons involved in such an experiment." Warren is notable for expounding the idea of "sovereignty of the individual".

In his Manifesto, Warren writes:

Warren said that Stephen Pearl Andrews' The Science of Society, published in 1852, was the most lucid and complete exposition of Warren's own theories  including Warren's belief that employers should pay their employees the full value of their labor according to the cost principle. Warren's theory of value places him within the tradition of free-market socialism. William Bailie states:

The outcome of Warren's theory of value, of Cost the Limit of Price, was to place him squarely in line with the cardinal doctrine of all other schools of modern socialism. He believed that labor was robbed through rent, interest, and profit and his aim, like that of the Socialists, was to prevent these modes of exploitation.

Ethics of pricing 
In 1827, Warren conceived the idea of labor notes, a scheme which was later practised in socialist Owenite labour exchanges in the mid-1830s.

Warren termed the phrase "cost the limit of price," with "cost" here referring not to monetary price paid but the labor one exerted to produce an item. He believed that goods and services should trade according to how much labor was exerted to produce them and bring them to market, instead of according to how individuals believed them to be subjectively worth.

Therefore, he "proposed a system to pay people with certificates indicating how many hours of work they did. They could exchange the notes at local time stores for goods that took the same amount of time to produce." To charge more labor for something that entailed less labor was "cannibalism," according to him. Moreover, he believed that trading according to "cost the limit of price" would promote increasing efficiency in an economy, as he explains in Equitable Commerce:

Inventions 
Josiah Warren is the inventor of the first rotary press. Warren began working on the idea in 1830, but he did not patent the invention, it was "simply given to the public.". A few years after exhibiting the invention in New York, Hoe and Company was reaping large sums of money marketing an identical press, one that would revolutionize printing toward the end of the 19th century.

Influence 
Catalan historian Xavier Diez reports that the intentional communal experiments pioneered by Warren were influential in European individualist anarchists of the late nineteenth and early twentieth centuries such as Émile Armand and the intentional communities started by them. In the United States Benjamin Tucker dedicated his collection of essays, Instead of a Book, to the memory of Warren, "my friend and master ... whose teachings were my first source of light". Tucker credits Warren with being "the first man to expound and formulate the doctrine now known as Anarchism."

John Stuart Mill, author of On Liberty, said Warren's philosophy, "though being a superficial resemblance to some of the project of the Socialists, is diametrically opposed to them in principle, since it recognizes no authority whatever in Society, over the individual, except to enforce equal freedom of development for all individuals." Warren's principle of the "sovereignty of the individual" was later taken up by Mill and Herbert Spencer.

See also 

 Anarchist economics
 Individualist anarchism in the United States
 Libertarian socialism
 Mutualism (economic theory)
 Time-based currency
 Utopian socialism

Notes

References 
 Martin, James J. Men Against the State: The Expositors of Individualist Anarchism in America, 1827–1908. Colorado Springs, CO: Ralph Myles Publishers, 1970.
 Miskelly, Matthew; and Jaime Noce. (eds) Political Theories For Students. Farmington Hills, MI: The Gale Group Inc., 2002. 
 Wunderlich, Roger. Low Living and High Thinking at Modern Times, New York. Syracuse, NY: Syracuse University Press, 1992.

External links 

 A biography of Warren by his son George W. Warren
 Josiah Warren's Manifesto
 Equitable Commerce by Josiah Warren
 Plan of the Cincinnati Labor for Labor Store by Josiah Warren
 True Civilization by Josiah Warren, hosted by the Anarchy Archives
 The Science of Society, by Stephan Pearl Andrews
 Josiah Warren: The First American Anarchist, by William Bailie
 Utopia The Successful Libertarian Market Socialist Economy by Nicholas Evans, hosted by BAD Press
 Utopia Drive: A Road Trip Through America's Most Radical Idea by Erik Reece
 Dyson, Verne. A History of Modern Times. Brentwood Public Library, 2015.
 Josiah Warren by his son George
 The Josiah Warren Project
 Josiah Warren – The First American Anarchist: “A Remarkable American”, by Magdalena Modrzejewska

1798 births
1874 deaths
19th-century American inventors
19th-century American male writers
19th-century American non-fiction writers
American anarchists
American anti-capitalists
American libertarians
American male non-fiction writers
American political writers
Deaths from edema
Founders of utopian communities
Free love advocates
Individualist anarchists
Mutualists
People from New Harmony, Indiana
People from Saugus, Massachusetts
Writers from Boston